Hays Bridge Historic District is a national historic district located in  Montgomery Township, Franklin County, Pennsylvania. The district includes two contributing buildings and two contributing structures. The buildings are a three-story, five bay limestone house and bank barn, dated to the early-19th century.  The structures are an early 19th-century stone double arch bridge and a Burr Truss covered bridge dated to 1883.  The covered bridge, known as Ped Bridge or Witherspoon Bridge, is 87 feet long and 14 feet wide, with a corrugated metal roof.  It is the only remaining covered bridge in Franklin County.

It was listed on the National Register of Historic Places in 1978.

References 

Covered bridges in Franklin County, Pennsylvania
Historic districts on the National Register of Historic Places in Pennsylvania
Historic districts in Franklin County, Pennsylvania
National Register of Historic Places in Franklin County, Pennsylvania
Covered bridges on the National Register of Historic Places in Pennsylvania
Road bridges on the National Register of Historic Places in Pennsylvania
Wooden bridges in Pennsylvania
Burr Truss bridges in the United States